The Juno Awards of 2023 was a music awards ceremony that was held on March 13, 2023 at Rogers Place in Edmonton, Alberta. It recognized the best recordings, compositions, and artists of the eligibility year determined by the members of the Canadian Academy of Recording Arts and Sciences.  Canadian actor Simu Liu, who hosted the 2022 ceremony, returned to host again.

The Weeknd received the most nominations (six) and had the most wins (5), followed by Avril Lavigne and Tate McRae with five nominations each, and Reklaws, Shawn Mendes, Preston Pablo and Banx & Ranx with three nominations each. With the six nominations, The Weeknd matched his personal records for both 2016 and 2021.

Background

Nominations 
Most nominations were announced on January 31, 2023. The nominees for Rap Album or EP of the Year, however, were announced on January 30 on the debut episode of Elamin Abdelmahmoud's new CBC Radio One talk show Commotion.

Most winners were announced at the "opening night" event on March 11, 2023, with only select high-profile categories reserved for the main ceremony on March 13.

Postponement 
The ceremony had originally been scheduled for March 12, but was rescheduled for the next day after the Academy of Motion Picture Arts and Sciences announced March 12 as the date of the 95th Academy Awards.

Ceremony
During the show's broadcast, a topless protester walked onto the stage while Avril Lavigne was introducing AP Dhillon onto the stage for a performance. The protester was later escorted off the stage.

Performances

Main ceremony 
The first wave of performers for the ceremony were announced in early January with Tennille Townes, and AP Dhillon confirmed a few days later. The 50 Years of Hip Hop performance was announced on March 3.

Winners and nominees
The following are the winners and nominees of the Juno Awards of 2023. Winners appear first and highlighted in bold.

People

Albums

Songs and recordings

Other

Special awards
CARAS announced Nickelback as the 2023 inductee into the Canadian Music Hall of Fame, and music manager Ron Sakamoto as the recipient of the Walt Grealis Special Achievement Award.

Multiple nominations and awards 
The following received multiple nominations:

Six:
The Weeknd

Five:
Avril Lavigne
Tate McRae

Three:
Reklaws
Shawn Mendes
Preston Pablo
Banx & RanxThe following received multiple awards:

Five:
The Weeknd

References

2023 in Canadian music
2023 music awards
2023 awards in Canada
Juno Awards
2023
2023 in Alberta
Events in Edmonton